Rayachoti (also known as "Rachaveedu", "Rayachoty", and "Rajaveedu") is a town and District headquarters of Annamayya district which is formed after Rajampet (Lok Sabha constituency) of the Indian state of Andhra Pradesh.
It is a municipality in Rayachoti Mandal (Tehsil) of the Rayachoti revenue division. It is one of the oldest towns in Andhra Pradesh.

Demographics

As of the 2011 Indian census, Rayachoti is classified as a municipal city in the district of YSR, Andhra Pradesh. The city of Rayachoti is divided into 34 wards, and city elections are held every 5 years. The Rayachoti Municipality has a population of 91,234 of which 46,517 are males and 44,717 are females.

The population of children aged 0–6 is 11,446, comprising 12.55% of the total population of Rayachoti. In Rayachoti Municipality, the female sex ratio is 961, lower than the state average of 993. The child sex ratio in Rayachoti is also lower, around 898 compared to an Andhra Pradesh state average of 939. The literacy rate of Rayachoti City is 73.58%, higher than the state average of 67.02%. In Rayachoti, Male literacy is around 82.07% while the female literacy rate is 64.84%.

Rayachoti Municipality has total administration over 20,452 houses to which it supplies basic amenities like water and sewerage. It is also authorised to build roads within Municipality limits and impose taxes on properties coming under its jurisdiction. It is a 3rd largest town by population, education, financial and economic after the Kadapa and Proddutur

History 

Rayachoti was historically governed by a wide array of kingdoms, sultanates, and empires. It used to be known as 'Rachouty' or 'Rachoutee'.

List of nations governing Rayachoti:
 Mysore (1557–1616)
 Bijapur Sultanate (1616–1693)
 Mughal Empire (1693–1710)
 Nawab of Carnatic (Arcot State) (1710–1770)
 Mysore Dominions (1770–1799)
 Ceded Districts (1799)
 Madras Presidency and Madras State until State Reorganisation in 1955

Villages in Rayachoti Mandal

Historical Members of the Legislative Assembly
 1955 – Y. Audinarayana Reddy – Indian National Congress
 1962 – Rachamalla Narayana Reddy – Swatantra Party
 1967 – M. K. Reddy – Indian National Congress
 1972 – Habibullah Mahal – Indian National Congress
 1978 – Sugavasi Palakondrayudu – Janata Party
 1983 – Sugavasi Palakondrayudu – Independent politician
 1985 – Mandipalle Nagi Reddy – Indian National Congress
 1989 – Mandipalle Nagi Reddy – Indian National Congress
 1994 – M. Narayana Reddy – Indian National Congress
 1999 – Sugavasi Palakondrayudu – Telugu Desam Party
 2004 – Sugavasi Palakondrayudu – Telugu Desam Party
 2009 – Gadikota Srikanth Reddy – Indian National Congress
2012-Gadikota Srikanth Reddy -YSR Congress Party-bypoll
 2014 –Gadikota Srikanth Reddy - YSR Congress Party
 2019 – Gadikota Srikanth Reddy – YSR Congress Party

Transport 
Rayachoti is well connected by road, rail (in construction) and air (45 km to Kadapa Airport). There are 9 main roads within the town. Three National highways pass through the town.

 National Highway 40, Kurnool–Piler-Chittoor–Ranipet passes through the town. NH40 is also called the Rayalaseema Express highway.
 National Highway 340 connects the town with the Kurabalakunta road of (Bangalore–Madanapalli–Rayachoti–Kadapa) Andhra Pradesh. 
 Proposed NH 370 Nellore to Anathapuram (Nellore–Rapur–Rajampet–Rayachoti–Kadiri–Anathapuram) is currently under planning.

The Andhra Pradesh State Road Transport Corporation operates bus services from the Rayachoti bus Depot.

There is a railway station under construction in Rayachoti under the Kadapa-Bangalore railway project.

Education
Primary and secondary school education is provided by both government-aided and private schools under the state's School Education Department. The languages of instruction followed by different schools include English, Telugu and Urdu.

Rayachoti has a literacy rate of 61.6%; male literacy is 73% and female literacy is 51%. Most adolescents leave the region upon graduation due to lack of employment opportunities.

The town has one of the oldest Teacher Training Institutes (DIET) in the region, dating back to the British occupation. There is an engineering college and a government polytechnic college in Rayachoti town. The town lacks more technical facilities and a medical college. Recently the Andhra Pradesh state government announced that Rayachoti will be administrated under the Annamayya Urban Development Agency, which is the good sign for future economic growth in this region.

Notable locations 
Rayachoti is known for its thousand-year old temple dedicated to Lord Sri Veerabhadra Swamy (also called Dakshina Kaasi). The temple is located on the bank of Mandavya river. This temple is unique in that Daksha Prajapati appears to be in the worshipping form of the Lord Veerabhadra Swamy.

References 
.

Cities and towns in Kadapa district